Elmer Francis McCormick (October 27, 1898February 4, 1951) was an American football player.  He played four seasons in the National Football League (NFL) as a center for the Buffalo All-Americans (1923), Buffalo Bisons (1924–1925), Frankford Yellow Jackets (1925), and Hartford Blues (1926). He was selected as the first-team center on the 1924 All-Pro Team.

References

1898 births
1951 deaths
Players of American football from Hartford, Connecticut
American football centers
Detroit Titans football players
Hartford Blues players
Frankford Yellow Jackets players
Buffalo All-Americans players
Buffalo Bisons (NFL) players